Libeskind Tower or PwC Tower, also called Il Curvo (The Curved One in English), is a skyscraper completed in 2020 in the city of Milan as part of the CityLife development project. It is the home for the Milan offices of PricewaterhouseCoopers. The project's designer and namesake is the Polish-American architect Daniel Libeskind.

The curve of the tower slopes toward its counterparts in the development, the Isozaki and Hadid towers and the Piazza Tre Torri below.

The Renaissance cupola is the basic principle behind Il Curvo's concept. It is reinterpreted through the concave movement of its elevation and it culminates in the crown, both distinctive elements of the project. The curved tower's facade is made of sustainable, state of the art glass, that will reflect the public space below and vistas around.

References

Skyscrapers in Milan
Skyscraper office buildings in Italy